The United Kingdom Census of 1861 recorded the people residing in every household on the night of 7 April 1861, and was the third of the UK censuses to include details of household members. The census was taken and recorded everyone living in a household on Sunday 7 April 1861  The 1861 format of the census was identical to the previous 1851 census, despite pressures for 'religious affiliation' questions to be included. This suggestion was rejected at the time.

The total population of England, Wales and Scotland was recorded as 23,085,579.

See also
Census in the United Kingdom
List of United Kingdom censuses

References

1861
Census
April 1861 events